Su Qiang (1931–2017) was a Chinese inorganic chemist. A pioneer in rare earth research and applications, he was elected an academician of the Chinese Academy of Sciences in 1995.

Su enrolled at Sun Yat-sen University in 1948, he transferred to Department of Chemical Engineering (which is a part of Tianjin University nowadays), Peking University two years later, and graduated in 1952. Then he went to Changchun, and became a professor there in 1983. He taught at Sun Yat-Sen University since 1999.

Su was the Chairman of the Second International Conference on the Spectra of Rare Earth Elements, and a Committee Member of the Third and Sixth International Conferences on f-elements.

References 

1931 births
2017 deaths
Chemists from Guangdong
Educators from Guangdong
Members of the Chinese Academy of Sciences
Peking University alumni
People from Guangzhou
Sun Yat-sen University alumni
Academic staff of Sun Yat-sen University
Tianjin University alumni
Rare earth scientists